Emre Turan (born 16 November 1990) is a Turkish professional footballer who plays as a centre-back for CFC Hertha 06.

Club career 
Born in Berlin, Turan played youth football in his hometown. In 2009, he joined Turkish top-division club Ankaraspor but after registering no first team appearances, returned to Germany the following year to sign for 3. Liga side, Eintracht Braunschweig. During his first season with the club, Braunschweig won promotion to the 2. Bundesliga. He made two appearances in the Bundesliga.

Turan's contract was not renewed beyond the 2012–2013 season. As a result, he signed for Regionalliga club Berliner AK 07 for the 2013–14 season.

After two years there, he left for fellow Regionalliga club, Optik Rathenow, with whom he has started at centre-back the past six seasons.

International career 
Turan has represented Turkey seven times at U18 level, playing in various matches against Russia, Holland and Switzerland.

References

External links 
 
 
 Emre Turan at Fupa

1990 births
Living people
Footballers from Berlin
German people of Turkish descent
Turkish footballers
Association football defenders
2. Bundesliga players
3. Liga players
Tennis Borussia Berlin players
Hertha BSC players
Ankaraspor footballers
Eintracht Braunschweig players
Eintracht Braunschweig II players
Berliner AK 07 players
FSV Optik Rathenow players
CFC Hertha 06 players
Turkey youth international footballers